Water gas is a kind of fuel gas, a mixture of carbon monoxide and hydrogen.  It is produced by "alternately hot blowing a fuel layer [coke] with air and gasifying it with steam".  The caloric yield of this is about 10% of a modern syngas plant.  Further making this technology unattractive, its precursor coke is expensive, whereas syngas uses cheaper precursor, mainly methane from natural gas.

Production
Synthesis gas is made by passing steam over a red-hot carbon fuel such as coke:
 (ΔH = +131 kJ/mol)

The reaction is endothermic, so the fuel must be continually re-heated to maintain the reaction. To do this, an air stream, which alternates with the vapor stream, is introduced to combust some of the carbon:
 (ΔH = -393 kJ/mol)

Theoretically, to make 6 L of water gas, 5 L of air is required. Alternatively, to prevent contamination with nitrogen, energy can be provided by using pure oxygen to burn carbon into carbon monoxide.
 (ΔH = -221 kJ/mol)

In this case, 1 L of oxygen will create 5.3 L of pure water gas.

History
The water-gas shift reaction was discovered by Italian physicist Felice Fontana in 1780. Water gas was made in England from 1828 by blowing steam through white-hot coke.

Hydrocarbonate (gas)

Hydrocarbonate is an archaic term for water gas composed of carbon monoxide and hydrogen generated by passing steam through glowing coke. Hydrocarbonate was classified as a factitious air and explored for therapeutic properties by eighteenth-century physicians including: Thomas Beddoes and James Watt. The term hydrocarbonate was coined by Thomas Beddoes in 1794. It should not be confused with the modern name "hydrogen carbonate" for bicarbonate ion.

Between 1794 and 1802, physicians such as Tiberius Cavallo and Davies Gilbert experimented with hydrocarbonate as an analgesic and anesthetic. Humphry Davy infamously inhaled three quarts of hydrocarbonate at the Pneumatic Institution and nearly died upon "sinking into annihilation"; Davy recovered two days later and concluded inhalation of more hydrocarbonate could have "destroyed life immediately without producing any painful sensations". Carbon monoxide is recognized to have a narcotic effect, therefore the scientists were likely experiencing carbon monoxide poisioning.

Diseases treated by hydrocarbonate included: tuberculosis, inflammation, asthma, expectoration, hemoptysis, pneumonia, hydrothorax, spasm and other indications. Many of the diseases treated with hydrocarbonate, whose active ingredient was carbon monoxide, are now being investigated using modern biomedical research methods to determine the therapeutic potential of carbon monoxide. For example, James Lind recognized hydrocarbonate to effectively treat lung inflammation; delivery of carbon monoxide via inhalation protocol or carbon monoxide-releasing molecules has significant preclinical data indicating an effective treatment for inflammation. The pioneering work of exploratory medicinal application of hydrocarbonate is an important origin for modern drug development.

James Watt suggested hydrocarbonate could act as "an antidote to the oxygen in blood" in 1794 and cautioned about the toxicity of an overdose prior to the discoveries of carbon monoxide (1800) and hemoglobin (1840). Despite Watt's observation, it is widely accepted that Claude Bernard had first described the mechanism for carbon monoxide poisoning by describing carbon monoxide's affinity for hemoglobin displacing oxygen to induce asphyxia circa 1857.

Lowe's gas process
In 1873, Thaddeus S. C. Lowe developed and patented the water gas process by which large amounts of hydrogen gas could be generated for residential and commercial use in heating and lighting. This gas provided a more efficient heating fuel than the common coal gas, or coke gas, which was used in municipal service. The process used the water-gas shift reaction:

The process was discovered by passing high-pressure steam over hot coal, the major source of coke gas. Lowe's process improved upon the chimney systems by which the coal could remain superheated, thereby maintaining a consistently high supply of the gas. The reaction produced carbon dioxide and hydrogen, which, after a process of cooling and "scrubbing", produced hydrogen gas.

The process spurred on the industry of gas manufacturing, and gasification plants were established quickly along the Eastern seaboard of the United States. Similar processes, like the Haber–Bosch process, led to the manufacture of ammonia (NH3) by the combining of nitrogen, found in air, with hydrogen. This spurred on the refrigeration industry, which long used ammonia as its refrigerant. Prof. Lowe also held several patents on artificial ice making machines and was able to run successful businesses in cold storage, as well as products which operated on hydrogen gas.

Variations

Carburetted water gas
Water gas has a lower heat of combustion than coal gas, so the calorific value was often boosted by passing the gas through a heated retort, into which oil was sprayed. The resulting mixed gas was called carburetted water gas. The average composition of carburated water gas is as follows: H=34-38%; CO=23-28%; saturated hydrocarbon=17-21%; unsaturated hydrocarbon=13-16%; CO=0.2-2.2%; N=2.5-5.0%. It is used as a source of heat since it has a high calorific value

Semi-water gas
Semi-water gas is a mixture of water gas and producer gas made by passing a mixture of air and steam through heated coke. The heat generated when producer gas is formed keeps the temperature of the coke high enough to allow water gas to be formed.

Water gas shift reaction
Pure hydrogen can be obtained from water gas by using the water-gas shift reaction, after subsequent removal of the carbon dioxide formed when carbon monoxide reacts with water.

Uses 
Completely displaced by syngas, water gas could be applied to certain fuel cells. Used in Fischer–Tropsch process. It reacts with producer gas to produce fuel gas. It could also be used to gain pure hydrogen for synthesis of ammonia.

See also

 Fluidized bed
 Fluidized bed combustion
 Gasification
 Linde–Frank–Caro process
 List of solid waste treatment technologies
 Plasma gasification
 Producer gas
 Pyrolysis
 Renewable natural gas
 Wood gas

References

 Mellor, J.W., Intermediate Inorganic Chemistry, Longmans, Green and Co., 1941, pp. 210–211
 Adlam, G.H.J. and Price, L.S., A Higher School Certificate Inorganic Chemistry, John Murray, 1944, page 309
 History e-book project. ACLS Humanities E-book. Vol 5. "The use of mineral oil" p. 119
 The chemistry of gas lighting, 1850.

Fuel gas
Hydrogen production
Synthetic fuel technologies
Industrial gases
History of chemistry

pl:Gaz wodny